The Boca West Open is a defunct men's tennis tournament that was played on the Grand Prix tennis circuit in 1984. The event was held in Boca Raton, Florida in the United States and was played on outdoor hard courts.  Jimmy Connors won the singles title while Mark Edmondson and Sherwood Stewart partnered to win the doubles title.

Finals

Singles

Doubles

References
 ATP Archives

Hard court tennis tournaments in the United States
Defunct tennis tournaments in the United States
ATP Tour
1984 in American tennis
1984 in sports in Florida